The 2020 National League 2, also known as the 2020 MPT Myanmar National League 2, is the 8th season of the MNL-2, the second division league for association football clubs since its founding in 2012. 3 months after being temporarily cancelled, the league itself was suspended.

Chinland and Junior Lions both promoted to the 2021 Myanmar National League. However, in the 2022 season, Myawady took Junior Lions' place.
The 1st transfer window is from 9 November 2019 to 10 January 2020 . The 2nd mid season transfer window is from 6 April 2020 to 7 May 2020.

Changes from last season

Team changes

New Clubs

 Junior Lions (Myanmar U-19)

Relegated Clubs

Relegated from the 2019 Myanmar National League
  Dagon (Withdrawn)
 Chinland

2020 Title Sponsor

Myanma Posts and Telecommunications signed 3 years contract with MNL. They help to develop Myanmar Football and Youth program.

Clubs

Stadiums

Personnel and sponsoring
Note: Flags indicate national team as has been defined under FIFA eligibility rules. Players may hold more than one non-FIFA nationality.

Foreign players

Result

League table

Matches 
Fixtures and Results of the 2020 MNL-2 season.

Week 1

Week 2

Week 3

Week 4

Week 5

Week 6

Week 7

Season statistics

Top scorers
As of  15 March 2020.

Awards

Monthly awards

References

External links
 2020 Myanmar National League

MNL-2 seasons
2020 in Burmese football